Ivica Križanac (born 13 April 1979) is a Croatian retired professional footballer who played as a defender.

Club career
Križanac was born in Split. He played for Górnik Zabrze of Poland where he became one of Polish league's best players. Following a two-year stay at Dyskobolia Grodzisk Wielkopolski he joined Russian Premier League side Zenit Saint Petersburg in 2005. He played in the 2008 UEFA Cup Final for Zenith, winning the biggest trophy of his career after beating Glasgow Rangers. Križanac was released by Zenit Saint Petersburg in January 2011, after spending six seasons at the club.

International career
Križanac made his international debut for Croatia in a friendly match against Slovenia on 20 August 2008 in Maribor, coming on as a half-time substitute for Dario Šimić. He was regularly included in the squad during the team's qualifying campaign for the 2010 FIFA World Cup, making 6 appearances in the competition. His final international appearance came in a friendly match against Belgium on 3 March 2010. After winning 11 caps for Croatia, he officially retired from the national team in May 2010.

Career statistics

Club

Honours
Zenit St. Petersburg
 Russian Premier League: 2007, 2010
 Russian Super Cup: 2008
 UEFA Cup: 2008
 UEFA Super Cup: 2008
 Russian Cup: 2010

References

External links
 
 
 
 
 
 Ivica Križanac at the Zenit St. Petersburg official website 

1979 births
Living people
Footballers from Split, Croatia
Association football central defenders
Croatian footballers
Croatia international footballers
HNK Šibenik players
NK Slaven Belupo players
NK Varaždin players
FK Jablonec players
AC Sparta Prague players
Górnik Zabrze players
Dyskobolia Grodzisk Wielkopolski players
FC Zenit Saint Petersburg players
RNK Split players
Croatian Football League players
Czech First League players
Ekstraklasa players
Russian Premier League players
UEFA Cup winning players
Croatian expatriate footballers
Expatriate footballers in the Czech Republic
Croatian expatriate sportspeople in the Czech Republic
Expatriate footballers in Poland
Croatian expatriate sportspeople in Poland
Expatriate footballers in Russia
Croatian expatriate sportspeople in Russia